is a passenger railway station located in the city of Funabashi, Chiba Prefecture, Japan, operated by the private railway operator Shin-Keisei Electric Railway.

Lines
Maebara Station is served by the Shin-Keisei Line, and is located 23.9 kilometers from the terminus of the line at Matsudo Station.

Station layout 
Maebara Station has two opposed side platforms connected by a footbridge. The station is somewhat unusual in that each platform has a separate exit.

Platforms

History
Maebara Station was opened on 13 December 1948. From 1961 to 1968, a spur line extended from Maebara Station to Shin-Tsudanuma Station via . The line was discontinued in 1968.

Passenger statistics
In fiscal 2018, the station was used by an average of 9,362 passengers daily.

Surrounding area
 Funabashi City Maehara Junior High School
 Funabashi City Maehara Elementary School
 Funabashi City Nakanoki Elementary School

See also
 List of railway stations in Japan

References

External links

  Shin Keisei Railway Station information

Railway stations in Japan opened in 1955
Railway stations in Chiba Prefecture
Funabashi